Hysterical History is a 1953 American animated short film directed by Isadore Sparber, in the Kartunes series.

Plot summary
The incomplete story of the history of the United States is told through several historical anecdotes, loaded with anachronisms.

The cartoon starts when Christopher Columbus discovers America, arrives at the new land, and is immediately greeted by native Americans recording a newsreel for Paramount and interviewing Columbus. The Pilgrim story of The Courtship of Miles Standish follows; when John Alden delivers Myles Standish's proposal to Priscilla Mullins, she counters why Alden didn't propose on his own behalf; Alden explains that he is more interested in Dorothy Lamour. Then the tale of John Smith and Pocahontas is told; as Smith is being burned at the stake, Pocahontas begs Chief Powhatan to spare Smith's life, but when Pocahontas is revealed to be morbidly obese, Smith panics and puts himself back onto the stake. Peter Stuyvesant is then portrayed with a peg leg that, when he is attacked by natives with bows and arrows, returns fire like a machine gun. Through the efforts of these early pioneers, the East Coast is transformed into the thirteen original states (though Rhode Island is initially squeezed out before forcing itself back into place).

Benjamin Franklin's kite experiment is depicted. The experiment initially fails, before Franklin uses the key to re-enter his house and is immediately struck by lightning. The cartoon skips forward to the California Gold Rush; upon James W. Marshall's discovery of gold, the Internal Revenue Service arrives in a helicopter to seize the nugget. Finally, Alexander Graham Bell is seen building the first telephone, but upon using it, learns his new device is a payphone when the operator asks for fifty cents.

The cartoon closes with the Statue of Liberty, who comes to life and instructs the audience to sing-along to "The Yankee Doodle Boy." Fireworks, which transform into the Paramount logo in the uncut version, close out the cartoon.

Cast
Jackson Beck as Narrator / Native-American Reporter / John Alden
Jack Mercer as Christopher Columbus / Native-American Reporter / Native-American Chief / Benjamin Franklin / James W. Marshall / Alexander Graham Bell
Mae Questel as Priscilla / Pocahontas / Phone Operator

Soundtrack
"Yankee Doodle Boy"

References

External links

1953 animated films
1953 short films
American animated short films
1950s English-language films
Films directed by Isadore Sparber
1950s American animated films
Paramount Pictures short films
Films based on songs
Cultural depictions of Christopher Columbus
Cultural depictions of Benjamin Franklin
Animation based on real people